Willens is a surname. Notable people with the surname include: 

Doris Willens (1924–2021), American singer-songwriter, journalist, advertising executive and author
Harold Willens (1914–2003), Ukrainian-American businessman and political activist
Heather Willens (born 1971), American tennis player
Howard P. Willens (born 1931), American lawyer and author